C-lehti (sometimes written as C=lehti) ('C-magazine') was a Finnish computer magazine targeted specifically at Commodore computers. It was in circulation between 1987 and 1992.

History and profile
C-lehti was started in 1987 as a spin-off of MikroBitti and was published six times per year. It was Finland's first ever computer magazine to only cover one specific family of computers. Originally, it covered the Commodore 64 (and to a lesser extent, its "bigger brother" Commodore 128) and the Amiga computers, but later it became more and more Amiga-centric, as the 64 and 128 were rapidly becoming obsolete. The magazine was part of Sanoma.

Later, as the Amiga was also becoming obsolete and lost market share to the PC computers and games consoles, C-lehti discontinued and was renamed Pelit in 1992. There were 29 magazine issues in total.

A character in C-lehti was the Guru, drawn by Harri "Wallu" Vaalio. The Guru, a bald man with a bushy beard and a shiny scalp, was the symbol for the magazine's hints and tips column. For hints & tips in computer games, he was called the Peliguru ("game guru") and had a joystick on top of his head. The Guru was never used again after the magazine was discontinued.

References

External links

 
 Table of content of several issues

1987 establishments in Finland
1992 disestablishments in Finland
Amiga magazines
Bi-monthly magazines published in Finland
Commodore 8-bit computer magazines
Computer magazines published in Finland
Defunct computer magazines
Defunct magazines published in Finland
Finnish-language magazines
Magazines established in 1987
Magazines disestablished in 1992